Nathan Goris (30 March 1990) is a Belgian professional football player who currently plays for KFC Ranst. He's a goalkeeper. He's a youth exponent from Lierse. He made his debut during the 2007/08 season. He was loaned out to K.V. Turnhout during the 2010/11 season.

Career
Goris joined KFC Ranst ahead of the 2019/20 season.

References

1990 births
Living people
Belgian footballers
Lierse S.K. players
KFC Turnhout players
Belgian Pro League players
Challenger Pro League players
Association football goalkeepers
People from Wilrijk